The 2016–17 Youngstown State Penguins men's basketball team represented Youngstown State University during the 2016–17 NCAA Division I men's basketball season. The Penguins, led by 12th-year head coach Jerry Slocum, played their home games at the Beeghly Center as members of the Horizon League. They finished the regular season 13–21, 5–13 in Horizon League play to finish in a tie for eighth place. As the No. 9 seed in the Horizon League tournament, they defeated Cleveland State and Oakland before losing to Northern Kentucky in the semifinals.

On March 7, 2017, Jerry Slocum announced he was retiring as head coach at Youngstown State. He had a record of 142–232 in 12 years at the school. On March 27, the school hired Jerrod Calhoun from Division II Fairmont State as the new head coach.

Previous season
The Penguins finished the 2015–16 season 11–21, 6–12 in Horizon League play to finish in seventh place. They lost to Detroit in the first round of the Horizon League tournament.

Departures

Incoming Transfers

Recruiting class of 2016

Roster

Schedule and results

|-
!colspan=9 style=| Exhibition

|-
!colspan=9 style=| Non-Conference regular season

|-
!colspan=9 style=| Horizon League regular season

|-
!colspan=9 style=|Horizon League tournament

References

Youngstown State Penguins men's basketball seasons
Youngstown
Youngstown State Penguins men's b
Youngstown State Penguins men's b